Peppe Terra is a brand of a ready-to-cook blend of tomatoes, red peppers and onions. It was launched in Nigeria in December 2010 by Tropical General Investment (TGI Nigeria Ltd). Peppe Terra contains lycopene. It is packaged and sold in 70g tetra paks as well as 70g, 210g, 400g, 800g, and 2.2 kg tins. It is marketed towards youths, housewives, and career women. Ingredients are natural and mostly procured locally, under stringent quality controls. However, given supply of these key ingredients are often subject to seasonality, in case of scarcity in local markets – some importation is also undertaken. The manufacturing unit is located at 14,Chivita Avenue, Ajao Estate. Lagos, Nigeria.

References 

Nigerian cuisine